Weasenham All Saints is a civil parish in the English county of Norfolk.
For the purposes of local government, it falls within the district of Breckland.

The village's name means 'Weosa's homestead/village'.

References

External links

Breckland District
Villages in Norfolk
Civil parishes in Norfolk